Hole in the Wall is a British game show that aired on BBC One in the United Kingdom. It also occasionally aired repeats of this show on CBBC until April 2014. This game was an adaptation of the Japanese game Brain Wall (also known as "Human Tetris") in which players must contort themselves to fit through cutout holes of varying shapes in a large polystyrene wall moving towards them as they stand in front of a swimming pool. Each week, two teams of television personalities competed for £10,000 in prize money to be donated to their chosen charity.

Dale Winton served as the original host while Strictly Come Dancing ballroom dancer Anton du Beke and former international cricketer Darren Gough were the team captains for the first series. Additionally, Jonathan Pearce commented on the replays and Peter Dickson provided the opening voice-over. The wall was activated by the presenter shouting Bring on the wall!.

On 3 July 2008, the BBC announced that the show had been commissioned for BBC One. A second series was confirmed, with Anton du Beke giving up his captain role to take over from Dale Winton as host and new team captains in the shape of former rugby player Austin Healey and actor Joe Swash with Jonathan Pearce now doing an opening voice-over plus replay commentary.

Format
The game was split into four rounds as well as the final "Great Wall" (known as "Mega Wall" in the first series).

The first round was "Solo Wall" which saw each team's guest players take a turn to face a wall just on their own. For each wall, 10 points were given to the player for a pass while a fail could be given up to 5 points depending on the host's whim.

Next was the "Captain's Challenge" or "Captain's Mate" which could be one of a number of games:

Doubles - The captain and a chosen teammate of his choosing (usually, the one they are encouraged to do so by the studio audience) both attempt a wall. A maximum of 20 points was on offer.
Props - The captain must complete the wall with a prop. This round made its first appearance when Anton Du Beke successfully cleared a wall on a space hopper.
Mirror Wall - The captain must attempt a wall backwards (facing the swimming pool) leaving his two teammates communicate to him about the shape he needs to make.
Blind Wall - The captain is blindfolded and his team members have to instruct to him the shape he needs to make.

The third round was "Mystery Guest or Killer Question", the team leading being offered the choice of which game they wished to play and the currently losing team playing the other challenge. A maximum of 20 points was on offer.

Killer Question - Two players face a wall without cut-outs with a question written at the top and two answers marked as doors. The "door" with the correct answer on it is perforated on the reverse side and so gives way. The players must pass through the correct door.
Mystery Guest - One of the team attempts a wall with a mystery guest (or several).

The fourth round was the "Team Wall". All three players face the wall with a maximum of 30 points on offer.

The programme's finale was the "Mega Wall". The leading team got to choose to attempt the wall or nominate the opposition. All three players on the team attempt the wall, which travels at double speed - if they clear the wall, they win the show (and the £10,000 to donate to a charity of their choice), while if they fail, the opposing team wins the £10,000.

Hole in the Wall used a specialised crane made by Street Crane Company of Chapel-en-le-Frith to move the wall.

Series 2 changes
Series 2, which started on 26 September 2009, contains all new challenges. Solo Wall returned with the Captain's Challenge changing its name to Captain's Mate. The Mystery Guest section was eliminated (although, it made appearances in Anton's Twist). Killer Question was now named Wonder Wall (with both teams now playing it as opposed to just one team), and a new challenge named Anton's Twist debuted. Team Wall also returned. The Mega Wall was renamed the Great Wall.

Anton's Twist, according to Anton, involved walls he'd invented with a twist.  Variations could be any number players with various twists (such as placing leg braces around the legs of team members commonly used in three-legged races), or the appearance of a mystery guest.  Notably, one episode had Anton announce a mystery guest for Joe Swash's team, and Joe asked, "Is it my mum?"  It turned out it was his mother, but the two failed the wall (although they still scored points for the team).

Production
Series 1 was recorded at BBC Television Centre in White City, West London, with series 2 seeing the show relocating to BBC Pacific Quay in Glasgow as part of an out-of-London production plan. For series 2, the show was also shot in high-definition.

The first series had the entire audience off to the left side (from the perspective of the cameras looking straight at the wall), with the team benches on the other side, and the scoreboards by each bench.  Winton, Du Beke, and Gough (as well as their teammates) would emerge from the left side when introduced, while the mystery guest(s) emerged from a platform below stage that rose to the top when introduced.  For the second series, the audience was placed on three sides of the set, and the scoreboards were placed on the floor, hence Anton's catchphrase: "The scores on the floor are..."

Episode guide
 -- Won by red team (Anton du Beke/Joe Swash)
 -- Won by blue team (Darren Gough/Austin Healey)

Series 1

* In episode 5, Michelle Heaton managed to remain dry by not failing a task but this resulted in teammates Darren Gough and Bobby Davro pushing her into the water.

× In episode 10, Anton's team were docked two points for cheating (shouting an incorrect call) during Darren's Captains Challenge (Darren being blind folded).

Series 2
This series started on 26 September 2009, presented by Anton du Beke.

Notes 

 In episode 4, Joe's team were docked ten points because Joe attempted to push Ricky Groves into the water as Ricky was struggling to stay on his feet after going through Team Wall.
 In episode 7, Austin bounced a ball on Anton's head, and then, he admitted it was meant to bounce on Joe's head, which because of that, 1 point was deducted.
 In episode 8, Austin's team were docked 10 points because Austin pushed Jonathan into the pool when he was helping Kate and Joe go through Wonder Wall.
 Due to the Royal British Legion Festival of Remembrance, Episode 6 was not broadcast originally. It involved Danielle Lloyd and Mark Foster playing for Joe and Debbie McGee and Ben James-Ellis playing for Austin.  The episode eventually aired 8 years later on Challenge in 2017.

References

External links

Review, Leicester Mercury.

2008 British television series debuts
2009 British television series endings
BBC television game shows
2000s British game shows
BBC Scotland television shows
Television series by Fremantle (company)
British television series based on Japanese television series